The Higher Education Army Institute (Spanish: Instituto de Educación Superior del Ejército. IESE) is an Argentine university founded in 1986 and officially in 1990 that belongs to the Argentine Army and which is responsible for the technical education of this force.

History 

It was created on January 1, 1986, in order to coordinate all the activities of the different academic institutions of the Argentine Army.  It became a National University in 1990 by the Argentine Law 17.778.

Structure 

The Institute encompass three education organizations associated with the Argentine Army: The War Academy, The Higher Technical School, and The Military High School.

Since 1993 the university is open to non-military students.

Undergraduate School 

 Officer of the Argentine Army (Management/Nursing)
 Mechanical Engineering (Weapons/Automobile)
 Electrical Engineering
 Geomatics Engineering
 Information Engineering

Graduate school

War Academy 

 M.S. History of war
 M.S. Strategy and Geopolitics

Higher Technical School 

 Specialist degree Control theory
 Specialist degree Cryptography and Information Security
 M.S. Safety Hygiene

See also
 List of Argentine universities

References

External links
 IESE

External links
Official website 

1986 establishments in Argentina
Argentine Army
Army Institute
Education in Buenos Aires
Educational institutions established in 1986
Universities in Buenos Aires Province